Henry Spicer (1837 – 18 October 1915) was an English stationer and Liberal politician.

Spicer was born at Islington, the son of Henry Spicer and his wife Sarah. His father was a wholesale stationer of the firm of Spicer Bros. Spicer received a congregationalist education at Mill Hill School, and New College, St. John's Wood. He graduated at the University of London and joined the wholesale stationery business. He was a J.P. for Middlesex, and a Member of London School Board.

In the 1885 general election, Spicer was elected Member of Parliament for Islington South but lost the seat in the 1886 general election.
Spicer's wife Lucy was from Calcutta.

References

External links 

1837 births
1915 deaths
Liberal Party (UK) MPs for English constituencies
UK MPs 1885–1886
People from Islington (district)
Alumni of the University of London
Members of the London School Board